Danesh may refer to:

 Danish (name) (or Danesh)
 Shahrak-e Danesh, Tehran
 Danesh Rural District
 Danesh (women's magazine)
 Danesh (scientific magazine)